Diocese of Derry may refer to:

 Roman Catholic Diocese of Derry
 Diocese of Derry and Raphoe (Church of Ireland)